Kut is a genus of Middle Eastern woodlouse hunting spiders. The type species was first described by Paolo Brignoli from a male found in Turkey, and it was placed with Harpactocrates. In a 1988 study, Christa L. Deeleman-Reinhold expressed doubt of the holotype's placement, but it wasn't transferred to its own genus until 2019. Two other species were identified, all with the same distinctive pedipalp features, including a pear-shaped tegulum with an otherwise featureless embolus.  it contains only three species: K. dimensis, K. izmiricus, and K. troglophilus.

See also
 Harpactocrates
 Hygrocrates
 Dysderocrates
 List of Dysderidae species

References

Further reading

Dysderidae genera
Arthropods of Turkey